Al-Mesaimeer Sports Club is a Qatari multi-sports club based in Mesaimeer. Its football department plays in the Qatari Second Division. It was previously known as Al-Nahda Sports Club, then Al-Shoala, and finally, today it is known as Mesaimeer Sports Club. It was promoted to the first division of Qatari football for the first time in history in the 2014–15 season.

History

Formation
The club was unofficially formed in 1996 (under the name "Al-Nahda Sports Club"), located in Doha due to administrative and financial dependence of the Qatar Football Association.

In 1998 His Highness the former Heir Apparent Sheikh Jasim bin Hamad bin Khalifa Al Thani, along with the Qatar Olympic Committee, officially founded the club followed by the formation of a constituent general assembly and the election of a board of directors. In light of that period the club's name was changed to Al-Shoala.

Relocation to Mesaimeer
In 2000, the construction of the club's official headquarters in the Mesaimeer area was completed under the supervision of National Olympic Committee, consisting of an administrative building, clothes changing rooms and a football field.

The board of directors' plans were re-examined to attract the local community to the club and form a base of players in all age groups starting from the juniors to the first team and provided facilities and services ranging from sports equipment and accessories to trainers, educators and advice from professional players.

The club began its participation in sporting events and the first team was runner-up in the second league numerous times. After a period of time, junior and youth players were playing against big teams and beating them, prompting the board of directors to show diligence and attention towards the younger players. They shifted their resources towards them and trained them well and provided them with attention outside the club, assisting them in their school studies, in addition to support within the club, in the hope that they will one day represent the first team.

In the year 2004, due to the desire of the members of the club's founders and employees, the club changed its name from Al-Shoala to Al-Mesaimeer Sports Club, in accordance to the region of where the club and its headquarters are situated.

In the 2014–15 season, the club finished in second place in the Qatargas League under Yousef Adam, thus winning promotion to the Qatar Stars League for the first time in its history.

Name history
1996 : Founded as Al-Nahda Sports Club
1998 : The club renamed to Al-Shoala Sports Club
2004 : The club renamed to Al-Mesaimeer Sports Club

Stadium
Built in 1998, the Al-Mesaimeer Stadium spans 36,000 m² and features two football pitches, locker rooms and an administrative office. However, due to its insufficient capacity and facilities, the club frequently uses the 3,000-capacity Al-Sailiya Stadium as its homegrounds.

Current squad

As of Qatari Second Division:

Management

Technical staff
Updated 18 June 2014.

Medical staff
Updated 18 June 2014.

Board of directors

Achievements
Qatari 2nd Division
 Winners (1): 2001

Managerial history

 Abdullah Saad 
 Costică Ștefănescu (2003) 
 Bagé 
 Hamdan Hamad (2005) 
 Obeid Jumaa 
 Paulo Henrique (2006) 
 Raad Abdul-Latif (2006–2007) 
 Fabio Araujo (2007–2008) 
 Zaluar (2008) 
 Fareed Ramzi (2008–2009) 

 Alberto Nazo (2009) 
 Raad Abdul-Latif (2009–2010) 
 Yousef Adam (2010) 
 Danny Hoekman (Dec 2010 – Sep 2011) 
 Jorge Paixão (Sep 2011 – Jan 2013) 
 Raad Abdul-Latif (Jan 2013 – Sep 2014) 
 Yousef Adam (Sep 2014 – May 2015) 
 Rodion Gačanin (May 2015 – May 2016) 
 Željko Markov (August 2016 – Aug 2018)

References

External links
Official website 
Goalzz.com – Mesaimeer

Mesaimeer Sports Club
Association football clubs established in 1996
1996 establishments in Qatar